Niall Macdonald (born 1980) is a Scottish visual artist.  He graduated in 2008 from the Glasgow School of Art.

Biography
Macdonald was born in 1980 in North Uist in the Outer Hebrides of Scotland. He received his Master of Fine Art from the Glasgow School of Art in 2008. Macdonald is represented by Koppe Astner (previously Kendall Koppe).

Exhibitions 
Niall Macdonald has exhibited nationally and internationally.
 Taigh Chearsabhagh. Lochmaddy, Outer Hebrides, Scotland - November 2017
 Kendall Koppe (now Koppe Astner) - The Ultimate Vessel - 20 Nov 2015 - 8 Jan 2016
 Tramway, Glasgow, Scotland - 2012

References 

Living people
Alumni of the Glasgow School of Art
Scottish contemporary artists
North Uist
1980 births